Patrick Joseph Christopher "Paddy" Roche (born 4 January 1951) is an Irish former football goalkeeper.

Born in Dublin, Roche started his career with Shelbourne with whom he won the first of his eight full international caps. During his time with Shelbourne he made 100 League of Ireland appearances and scored one league goal. He was on the losing side in the 1973 FAI Cup Final as they lost to Cork Hibernians in a replay. He transferred to Manchester United in 1973 for a fee of £15,000.

Roche made 46 league appearances for United, largely playing second-fiddle to Alex Stepney and then Gary Bailey. In 1982, he transferred to Brentford, before joining Halifax Town two years later. He moved on in 1989 after 184 Football League appearances for the Shaymen, briefly spending time with Chester City as cover for Billy Stewart. However, he left after failing to make any first-team appearances for the Cheshire side. Once retired, he returned to Halifax to take on a role coaching youngsters for their Football in the Community scheme.

Roche's brother Willie played for St. Patrick's Athletic and his nephew Paul played for University College Dublin.

Roche played 8 games for the Republic of Ireland national football team, keeping three clean sheets.

References

External links
 

1951 births
Living people
Association footballers from County Dublin
Association football goalkeepers
Republic of Ireland association footballers
Republic of Ireland international footballers
Republic of Ireland under-23 international footballers
Shelbourne F.C. players
Manchester United F.C. players
Halifax Town A.F.C. players
Brentford F.C. players
Chester City F.C. players
Northwich Victoria F.C. players
League of Ireland players
English Football League players